Dominican Republic competed at the 2014 Summer Youth Olympics, in Nanjing, China from 16 August to 28 August 2014.

Medalists
Medals awarded to participants of mixed-NOC (Combined) teams are represented in italics. These medals are not counted towards the individual NOC medal tally.

Athletics

Dominican Republic qualified two athletes.

Qualification Legend: Q=Final A (medal); qB=Final B (non-medal); qC=Final C (non-medal); qD=Final D (non-medal); qE=Final E (non-medal)

Boys
Track & road events

Boxing

Dominican Republic qualified one boxer based on its performance at the 2014 AIBA Youth World Championships

Boys

Equestrian

Dominican Republic qualified a rider.

Judo

Dominican Republic qualified one athlete based on its performance at the 2013 Cadet World Judo Championships.

Individual

Team

Sailing

Dominican Republic qualified one boat based on its performance at the 2013 World Byte CII Championships.

Swimming

Dominican Republic qualified two swimmers.

Boys

Girls

Weightlifting

Dominican Republic qualified 1 quota in the boys' events based on the team ranking after the 2014 Weightlifting Youth Pan American Championships.

Boys

Wrestling

Dominican Republic qualified one athlete based on its performance at the 2014 Pan American Cadet Championships.

Boys

References

2014 in Dominican Republic sport
Nations at the 2014 Summer Youth Olympics
Dominican Republic at the Youth Olympics